Dancing Alone: Songs of William Hawkins is a 2008 tribute album, released by True North Records.  On the record, a number of Canadian artists pay tribute to the songs of William Hawkins, an influential Canadian songwriter and poet.

Critical reaction 
The album was generally well received.  As noted by one reviewer, "As this multi-artist, two-CD collection proves, Hawkins was – and could well still be – an exceptionally gifted musical craftsman, an imaginative and quirky composer of charming melodies, and a superior lyricist who walked the line between poetic distillation and conversational vernacular. ...His songs here are rendered in exceptionally spirited performances by Hawkins' peers and younger admirers... If you buy just one roots music album this year, this one will not disappoint."

Track listing 
 Scorpio  Lynn Miles  3:35 
 Long Lean Lonely Angel  Bill Stevenson  3:29  
 Louis Riel  Sneezy Waters  5:22  
 The Trains Don't Run Here Anymore  Bruce Cockburn  3:22  
 Tell Me That Story  Ian Tamblyn  4:36  
 Stone Solid Blue  Ana Miura  2:55  
 Royal Boost  Sandy Crawley  2:33  
 Merry Go Round  Kellylee Evans  4:04  
 Frankly Stoned  Suzie Vinnick  4:30  
 Alison  Neville Wells  3:35  
 Worry Worry  Mike Evin  2:38  
 Gnostic Serenade  Brent Titcomb  2:48 
 Io [instrumental]     2:02  
 Funny How People Get Old  Murray McLauchlan  3:01  
 Get Free  Ana Miura  3:37  
 Misunderstanding  Sneezy Waters  5:14  
 Io  Lynn Miles  3:21  
 It's a Dirty Shame  Terry Gillespie  2:45  
 Christopher's Movie Matinee  Brent Titcomb  2:03  
 Your Time Has Come  Suzie Vinnick  3:55  
 Midnight Gambler  Ian Tamblyn  2:54  
 Cotton Candy Man  Sandy Crawley  4:10  
 Merry Go Round  Murray McLauchlan  3:45  
 Gnostic Serenade  Bill Stevenson  6:45 
 Memories: A Poem  William Hawkins

Credits

Vocalists and musicians
 Bruce Cockburn Lead Vocals and Guitar 
 Murray McLauchlan Lead Vocals, Guitar, Keyboards
 Ian Tamblyn Lead Vocals, Guitar, Keyboards, Penny Whistle
 Sandy Crawley Lead Vocals, Guitar, Banjo
 Neville Wells Lead Vocals, Guitar
 Sneezy Waters Lead Vocals, Guitar
 Terry Gillespie Lead Vocals, Guitar 
 Brent Titcomb Lead Vocals, Guitar, Percussion
 Bill Stevenson Lead Vocals, Piano
 Lynn Miles Lead Vocals, Guitar, Mandolin
 Suzie Vinnick Lead Vocals, Guitar, Bass
 Mike Evin Lead Vocals, Piano
 Ana Miura Lead Vocals, Guitar 
 Kellylee Evans Lead and Background Vocals 
 Rebecca Campbell Background Vocals
 Kevin Ramessar Guitar 
 Dennis Pendrith Bass
 Tom Easley Bass
 Ken Kanwisher Bass, Cello
 Ross Murray Drums
 Al Cross Drums
 Gordon Adamson Drums, Bongos 
 Anne Lindsay Violin, Viola, String Arrangements 
 Petr Cancura Clarinet  
 Jody Golick Penny Whistle

Other contributions
 Steve Foley Engineer
 Ken Kanwisher Engineer
 Russ Brannon Engineer
 Ross Murray Engineer
 Roman Klun Assistant Engineer
 Dave Bignell Mixing  
 David Cain Mastering
 Chris Wells Cover Painting
 Sandy Crawley Liner Notes
 Doug McArthur Assistant 
 Kellylee Evans Producer 
 Terry Gillespie Producer
 Murray McLauchlan Producer
 Ian Tamblyn Producer, Mixing, Remixing
 Harvey Glatt Executive Producer

References 

2008 compilation albums
Compilation albums by Canadian artists
True North Records albums
Tribute albums